The Federal College of Fisheries and Marine Technology is a higher education institute located on Victoria Island in Lagos, Nigeria.
It is a monotechnic approved by the National Board for Technical Education. 
The College was originally known as the Federal School of Fisheries, established in 1969 as a vocational training institute for Nigeria's in-shore fishing fleet. It was upgraded to a technological institution in 1992. The college offers courses in fisheries technology, general science, marine engineering, nautical science and Maritime Transport and Business Management.
It has two hostels, accommodating about 450 students.

The college is headed by a provost who reports the Minister of Agriculture. In February 2009 Samuel Azikwe Zelibe, former head of the Fisheries Department of Delta State University, was appointed provost. In January 2010 the provost warned that despite the N74 million government allocation and a N37.4 million World Bank grant last year, the college had scarcely enough funding to cover basic needs, let alone upgrade facilities and purchase a training vessel.
He said more money was needed to develop a Fishery Technology laboratory, raise buildings and build roads.

The college fronts Victoria Beach, which is rapidly eroding. Two years later, waves had reached to within a few meters of the foundation of the buildings, forcing construction of a protective groyne.

See also
 List of polytechnics in Nigeria

References

1969 establishments in Nigeria
Educational institutions established in 1969
Universities and colleges in Lagos
Victoria Island, Lagos
Agricultural universities and colleges in Nigeria
Fishing in Nigeria
Federal universities of Nigeria